Georges Melchior (15 September 1889 – 2 September 1944) was a French actor of the silent era. He appeared in 67 films between 1911 and 1937.

Selected filmography
 Fantômas (1913)
 L'Atlantide (1921)
 The Clairvoyant (1924)
 Le p'tit Parigot (1926)
 The Temple of Shadows (1927)
 Siren of the Tropics (1927)
 House in the Sun (1929)
 Sister of Mercy (1929)
 For an Evening (1931)
 Billeting Order (1932)
 The Citadel of Silence (1937)

External links

1889 births
1944 deaths
French male film actors
French male silent film actors
20th-century French male actors